Progressive Labor Party or Progressive Labour Party may refer to:

Progressive Labor Party (United States), a Marxist–Leninist political party based primarily in the U.S.
Progressive Labour Party (Australia)
Progressive Labour Party (Bermuda)
Progressive Labour Party (Dominica)
Progressive Labour Party (Saint Lucia)
Progressive Labour Party (Sint Eustatius)
Progressive Labour Movement in Antigua and Barbuda
Progressive Labour Federation 47 in Suriname
Progressive Labour Party of Alberta, Canada

See also 
Progressive Party (disambiguation)
PLP (disambiguation)